Sackville 4005 is a jazz album by Ed Bickert and Don Thompson, which was released in 1978 by Sackville Recordings. The album was recorded in concert at the Garden Party, January 22, 1978. It won the 1980 Juno Award for Best Jazz Recording.

Track listing 

 "Alone Together" - 6:08
 "A Face Like Yours" - 5:26
 "You Are Too Beautiful" - 6:21
 "What Is This Thing Called Love" - 6:21
 "Who Can I Turn To" - 7:27
 "Walkin' My Baby Back Home" - 2:59
 "Please Be Kind" - 6:09

References 

1978 live albums
Juno Award for Best Jazz Album albums
Jazz albums by Canadian artists